George W. Chamillard (born 1939 in Needham, MA) is an American business executive who served as chairman of the board of directors at Teradyne, a manufacturer of automatic test equipment for semiconductor devices, from 2000 to 2006., and CEO from 1997 to 2004.

Career

After receiving a bachelor's degree in industrial technology from the Lincoln Institute, an evening engineering program at Northeastern University, Chamillard joined Teradyne as an engineer in 1969. He eventually headed the corporation as president and COO, appointed in 1996 to fill these roles upon the departure of Alex d'Arbeloff, one of the two founders. 1997 saw him also assume the title of CEO. In 2004, Chamillard retired from those roles and was replaced by Mike Bradley, but served on as the chairman of Teradyne's board of directors. He turned over the chairmanship on December 31, 2006 to Patricia S. Wolpert.

Chamillard remains a member of the boards of directors of Mercury Computer Systems and SEMI. He is also trustee for Wentworth Institute of Technology and Northeastern University.

Personal life

Chamillard has four children and is married to Maureen Chamillard.

References

External links 
 Teradyne Inc., corporate history

American technology chief executives
American electrical engineers
Living people
Northeastern University alumni
1939 births
People from Needham, Massachusetts
American chief operating officers
Businesspeople from Massachusetts